Zuercherella is an extinct genus of cephalopods belonging to the Ammonite subclass.

References 

Ammonite genera